Kabayan, Becomes  a Billionaire is a 2010 Indonesian comedy-drama film directed by Guntur Soeharjanto, written by Cassandra Massardi, and stars Jamie Aditya, Rianti Cartwright, Didi Petet, Meriam Bellina, and Aming.

Plot
The tranquil village in West Java, home of the modest boarding  school led by the Islamic cleric Ustadz Sholeh (Slamet Rahardjo), is suddenly disturbed by the presence of real estate entrepreneur Boss Rocky (Christian Sugiono) who intends to buy the land and develop a resort. But Boss Rocky encounters an unexpected opponent. His name is Kabayan (Jamie Aditya), the right-hand man of Ustadz Sholeh, and Kabayan is a man immune to bribes and more powerful persuasions. With his loyal friend Armasan (Aming), Kabayan steadfastly rejects Boss Rocky's plans. But seeing Kabayan's infatuation for Iteung (Rianti Cartwright), his lovely accountant, Boss Rocky orders Iteung to spy on Kabayan and trick him into signing the land purchase agreement, even drafting the help of Iteung's parents through false promises of preserving the village as well as building a mosque in their name.

Kabayan unknowingly signs the contract mistaking it for a marriage certificate. While Kabayan waits for his bride, Iteung, in vain, Ustadz Sholeh  is told that the property now belongs to Boss Rocky. Determined  to reclaim his home and capture Iteung's heart, Kabayan goes to Jakarta and finds that Iteung's parents have promised her to Boss Rocky, believing his plans to build a mosque in their name. They give  Kabayan only one chance to win Iteung, to obtain an amount of 1 billion Rupiah in a week.

Cast 
 Jamie Aditya as Kabayan
 Rianti Cartwright as Iteung
 Aming as Armasan
 Didi Petet as Abah
 Meriam Bellina as Ambu
 Slamet Rahardjo as Ustadz Sholeh
 Christian Sugiono as Boss Rocky
 Melly Goeslaw as Secretarist

References

External links
 

2010 comedy-drama films
2010 films
Indonesian comedy-drama films
Films scored by Melly Goeslaw
Films scored by Anto Hoed